The 2013 Bavarian state election was held on 15 September 2013 to elect the 180 members of the 17th Landtag of Bavaria. It was held one week before the 2013 German federal election. The CSU regained the absolute majority it had lost in 2008, while the Free Democratic Party (FDP), a member of the outgoing governing coalition, fell below the 5% electoral threshold and lost all its seats. Minister-President Horst Seehofer continued in office.

This election was the last election in which a party got an absolute majority in a state parliament until the 2022 Saarland state election. The CSU previously held an absolute majority, and therefore governed alone, from 1966 to 2008 and again from 2013 to 2018. Previously, even in the late 1990s, it was common that either the CDU/CSU or the SPD got an absolute majority in a state election. For example, this happened in Brandenburg in 1994, 1998 in Lower Saxony and 1999 in Saxony
.

Parties
The table below lists parties represented in the 16th Landtag of Bavaria.

Opinion polling

Election result
The CSU regained an absolute majority of the seats, which they had lost in the 2008 election after 50 years of single-party government. The FDP, which had governed with the CSU since 2008, fell below the 5% threshold and lost all its seats. SPD, the Greens and Free Voters remained in opposition. A record number of 14.1% of the votes cast went unrepresented in the Landtag because of the 5% threshold.

|-
! colspan="2" | Party
! Votes
! %
! +/-
! Seats 
! +/-
! Seats %
|-
| bgcolor=| 
| align=left | Christian Social Union (CSU)
| align=right| 5,632,272
| align=right| 47.7
| align=right| 4.3
| align=right| 101
| align=right| 9
| align=right| 56.1
|-
| bgcolor=| 
| align=left | Social Democratic Party (SPD)
| align=right| 2,436,515
| align=right| 20.6
| align=right| 2.0
| align=right| 42
| align=right| 3
| align=right| 23.3
|-
| bgcolor=#007E82| 
| align=left | Free Voters of Bavaria (FW)
| align=right| 1,062,244
| align=right| 9.0
| align=right| 1.2
| align=right| 19
| align=right| 2
| align=right| 10.6
|-
| bgcolor=| 
| align=left | Alliance 90/The Greens (Grüne)
| align=right| 1,018,652
| align=right| 8.6
| align=right| 0.8
| align=right| 18
| align=right| 1
| align=right| 10.0
|-
! colspan=8|
|-
| bgcolor=| 
| align=left | Free Democratic Party (FDP)
| align=right| 389,584
| align=right| 3.3
| align=right| 4.7
| align=right| 0
| align=right| 16
| align=right| 0
|-
| bgcolor=| 
| align=left | The Left (Linke)
| align=right| 251,086
| align=right| 2.1
| align=right| 2.2
| align=right| 0
| align=right| ±0
| align=right| 0
|-
| bgcolor=#386ABC| 
| align=left | Bavaria Party (BP)
| align=right| 247,282
| align=right| 2.1
| align=right| 1.0
| align=right| 0
| align=right| ±0
| align=right| 0
|-
| bgcolor=| 
| align=left | Ecological Democratic Party (ÖDP)
| align=right| 239,235
| align=right| 2.0
| align=right| 0.0
| align=right| 0
| align=right| ±0
| align=right| 0
|-
| bgcolor=| 
| align=left | Pirate Party Germany (Piraten)
| align=right| 234,221
| align=right| 2.0
| align=right| New
| align=right| 0
| align=right| New
| align=right| 0
|-
| bgcolor=| 
| align=left | The Republicans (REP)
| align=right| 117,633
| align=right| 1.0
| align=right| 0.4
| align=right| 0
| align=right| ±0
| align=right| 0
|-
| 
| align=left | Party for Franconia
| align=right| 87,237
| align=right| 0.7
| align=right| New
| align=right| 0
| align=right| New
| align=right| 0
|-
| bgcolor=| 
| align=left | National Democratic Party (NPD)
| align=right| 74,895
| align=right| 0.6
| align=right| 0.6
| align=right| 0
| align=right| ±0
| align=right| 0
|-
| bgcolor=|
| align=left | Others
| align=right| 22,019
| align=right| 0.2
| align=right| 0.2
| align=right| 0
| align=right| ±0
| align=right| 0
|-
! align=right colspan=2| Total
! align=right| 11,812,965
! align=right| 100.0
! align=right| 
! align=right| 180
! align=right| 7
! align=right| 
|-
! align=right colspan=2| Voter turnout
! align=right| 
! align=right| 63.6
! align=right| 5.5
! align=right| 
! align=right| 
! align=right| 
|}

Notes

References

2013 elections in Germany
2013
2013 in Bavaria
September 2013 events in Germany